Minuscule 728 (in the Gregory-Aland numbering), Θε412 (von Soden), is a Greek minuscule manuscript of the New Testament written on parchment. Palaeographically it has been assigned to the 14th century. The manuscript has complex contents. Scrivener labelled it as 746e.

Description 

The codex contains a complete text of the four Gospels on 231 parchment leaves (size ), without any lacunae.

The text is written in two columns per page, 60-68 lines per page.

There is also a division according to the smaller Ammonian Sections, but without references to the Eusebian Canons.

It has a commentary of Theophylact.

Text 

Kurt Aland did not place the Greek text of the codex in any Category.

It was not examined by using the Claremont Profile Method.

History 

Scrivener dated the manuscript to the 13th century, Gregory dated it to the 14th century. The manuscript is currently dated by the INTF to the 14th century.

It was added to the list of New Testament manuscripts by Scrivener (746) and Gregory (728). It was examined and described by Paulin Martin. Gregory saw the manuscript in 1885.

The manuscript is now housed at the Bibliothèque nationale de France (Gr. 181) in Paris.

See also 

 List of New Testament minuscules
 Biblical manuscript
 Textual criticism

References

Further reading 

 

Greek New Testament minuscules
14th-century biblical manuscripts
Bibliothèque nationale de France collections